{{Infobox film
| name           = Boundin'
| image          = Boundin' poster.jpg
| caption        = Poster for Boundin| alt            = Poster for Boundin'
| director       = Bud Luckey
| producer       = Osnat Shurer
| writer         = Bud Luckey
| starring       = Bud Luckey
| narrator       = Bud Luckey
| music          = Bud Luckey
| cinematography = Jesse Hollander
| editing        = Steve Bloom
| studio         = Pixar Animation Studios
| distributor    = Buena Vista Pictures
| released       = 
| runtime        = 5 minutes
| country        = United States
| budget         =
| gross          =
}}Boundin is a 2003 American computer-animated short film, which was shown in theaters before the feature-length superhero film The Incredibles. The short is a musically narrated story about a dancing sheep, who loses his confidence after being sheared. The film was written, directed, narrated and featured the musical composition and performance of Pixar animator Bud Luckey.

Plot
In the American West, a lamb’s elegant dancing is popular with the other animals. One day sheep-shearers arrive and shear him for wool. The other animals mock his skinny, bare state and he becomes shy and loses the confidence to dance. As the sheep mourns, a benevolent jackalope comes across him, and teaches him the merits of "bounding", not just dancing (that is, getting up whenever you fall down). The sheep is converted and his joy in life is restored. The sheep's wool eventually grows back in the winter, only for it to be cut again, but his confidence is now completely unshaken and he continues to "bound."

Voice cast
Bud Luckey as Lamb, Jackalope and Narrator

Production
Writer-director Bud Luckey designed and voiced all the characters, composed the music and wrote the story. According to the director's commentary for The Incredibles, Brad Bird wanted to introduce the animated short by having Rick Dicker, (the superhero relocator from The Incredibles, also voiced by Luckey) enter a room, sit down, and pull out a bottle of "booze" and a banjo.

This is the first Pixar short with a theatrical release that included vocal performances with words (Bobby McFerrin did an a capella song for Knick Knack). All prior films included only music and sound effects.

The Cars DVD contains a version of Boundin''' with Mater as the jackalope, Lightning McQueen as the sheep, and Guido as the gophers as an Easter egg.

Theatrical and home media release
To qualify for the 76th Academy Awards, Pixar arranged in December 2003 special screenings of the short at the Laemmle Theatres in Los Angeles.Boundin was released on March 15, 2005, on The Incredibles two-disc DVD collector's release, including commentary from Bud Luckey and the short clip titled Who is Bud Luckey?. The film was also released as part of Pixar Short Films Collection, Volume 1'' in 2007.

Awards
 2004: Annie Award — Best Animated Short Subject (Won)
 2004: Academy Award — Best Animated Short Film (Nominated)

References

External links

 
 
 

2000s English-language films
2003 computer-animated films
2003 short films
2000s American animated films
2000s animated short films
Animated films about rabbits and hares
Best Animated Short Subject Annie Award winners
Cars (franchise)
Films about sheep
Films set in deserts
Pixar short films
American children's animated musical films
American folk songs
American animated short films